Dolichoctis is a genus of beetles in the family Carabidae. It was first described by Schmidt-Gobel in 1846.

Species 
Dolichoctis contains the following species:
 Dolichoctis aculeata Chaudoir, 1869
 Dolichoctis aculeoides Baehr, 1999
 Dolichoctis anceps Andrewes, 1929
 Dolichoctis andamanica Baehr, 2013
 Dolichoctis andrewesi Jedlicka, 1934
 Dolichoctis angulicollis Chaudoir, 1869
 Dolichoctis angustemaculata Baehr, 1999
 Dolichoctis angusticollis Bates, 1892
 Dolichoctis aruensis Baehr, 2015
 Dolichoctis aterrima Baehr, 2013
 Dolichoctis avicapitis Baehr, 1999
 Dolichoctis badiadorsis Hunting & Yang, 2019
 Dolichoctis baumi Jedlicka, 1955
 Dolichoctis biak Baehr, 1999
 Dolichoctis bicolor Baehr, 1999
 Dolichoctis bifasciata Andrewes, 1931
 Dolichoctis bisetosa Baehr, 1999
 Dolichoctis bisetosipes Baehr, 2013
 Dolichoctis castanea Darlington, 1968
 Dolichoctis chitra Andrewes, 1923
 Dolichoctis constricticollis Andrewes, 1931
 Dolichoctis convexa Andrewes, 1923
 Dolichoctis curvicollis Baehr, 2013
 Dolichoctis cylindripennis Baehr, 2013
 Dolichoctis darlingtoni Baehr, 1999
 Dolichoctis dentata Darlington, 1968
 Dolichoctis dentifera Baehr, 2013
 Dolichoctis depokensis Louwerens, 1951
 Dolichoctis dilatata Hunting & Yang, 2019
 Dolichoctis distorta Darlington, 1968
 Dolichoctis divisa Darlington, 1968
 Dolichoctis elegans Andrewes, 1929
 Dolichoctis elongata Baehr, 1999
 Dolichoctis erythrospinosa Baehr, 2006
 Dolichoctis exigua Baehr, 1999
 Dolichoctis expansicollis Bates, 1892
 Dolichoctis falciplaga Baehr, 2013
 Dolichoctis fasciola Bates, 1886
 Dolichoctis figurata Andrewes, 1929
 Dolichoctis gilvipes (Dejean, 1831)
 Dolichoctis glabripennis Baehr, 2003
 Dolichoctis globosa Andrewes, 1930
 Dolichoctis goaensis Kirschenhofer, 2012
 Dolichoctis goniodera Bates, 1886
 Dolichoctis huon Darlington, 1968
 Dolichoctis immaculata (L.Redtenbacher, 1867)
 Dolichoctis incerta Bates, 1892
 Dolichoctis iridea Bates, 1892
 Dolichoctis iridescens Louwerens, 1952
 Dolichoctis ivimkae Baehr, 2013
 Dolichoctis jacobsoni Andrewes, 1929
 Dolichoctis jakli Baehr, 2013
 Dolichoctis keiana Baehr, 1999
 Dolichoctis kitchingi Baehr, 2013
 Dolichoctis kjellanderi Louwerens, 1964
 Dolichoctis kulti Jedlicka, 1963
 Dolichoctis lackneri Baehr, 2013
 Dolichoctis latibasis Baehr, 2013
 Dolichoctis laticollis Baehr, 1999
 Dolichoctis latithorax Louwerens, 1956
 Dolichoctis lis Andrewes, 1929
 Dolichoctis longicornis Baehr, 1999
 Dolichoctis ludewigi Baehr, 2017
 Dolichoctis lunigera Andrewes, 1926
 Dolichoctis maculipennis Louwerens, 1958
 Dolichoctis major Baehr, 1999
 Dolichoctis malayica Baehr, 2013
 Dolichoctis malickyi Baehr, 2013
 Dolichoctis marginifer (Walker, 1858)
 Dolichoctis mehli Baehr, 2013
 Dolichoctis microdera Andrewes, 1930
 Dolichoctis multistriata Andrewes, 1929
 Dolichoctis munda Baehr, 2013
 Dolichoctis negrosensis Baehr, 2013
 Dolichoctis nigricauda Baehr, 2007
 Dolichoctis novaeirlandiae Baehr, 2003
 Dolichoctis obliqueplagiata Baehr, 2013
 Dolichoctis ocularis Baehr, 2013
 Dolichoctis ophthalmica Baehr, 1999
 Dolichoctis opima Andrewes, 1929
 Dolichoctis ornata Baehr, 2013
 Dolichoctis ovipennis Baehr, 2015
 Dolichoctis pahangensis Kirschenhofer, 2010
 Dolichoctis pallipes Louwerens, 1964
 Dolichoctis paradentata Baehr, 2006
 Dolichoctis parallelipennis Baehr, 2015
 Dolichoctis parvicollis Chaudoir, 1869
 Dolichoctis pedestris Darlington, 1970
 Dolichoctis philippinensis Jedlicka, 1934
 Dolichoctis picea Baehr, 2006
 Dolichoctis picescens Baehr, 2007
 Dolichoctis picta Baehr, 2013
 Dolichoctis platycollis Baehr, 2013
 Dolichoctis polita Darlington, 1968
 Dolichoctis polygramma Andrewes, 1930
 Dolichoctis pumila Andrewes, 1933
 Dolichoctis punctipennis Jedlicka, 1963
 Dolichoctis quadratipennis Andrewes, 1929
 Dolichoctis riedeli Baehr, 1999
 Dolichoctis rotundata (Schmidt-Goebel, 1846)
 Dolichoctis ruficollis Baehr, 2013
 Dolichoctis rugaticollis Baehr, 2013
 Dolichoctis rutilipennis Bates, 1892
 Dolichoctis salomona Baehr, 1999
 Dolichoctis sikkimensis Baehr, 2013
 Dolichoctis sinuaticollis Baehr, 2007
 Dolichoctis skalei Baehr, 2015
 Dolichoctis spadicea Baehr, 2013
 Dolichoctis spatulata Baehr, 2013
 Dolichoctis spinipennis Chaudoir, 1869
 Dolichoctis spinosa Darlington, 1968
 Dolichoctis spinosissima Baehr, 2012
 Dolichoctis stevensi Baehr, 2013
 Dolichoctis striata Schmidt-Goebel, 1846
 Dolichoctis subquadrata Darlington, 1968
 Dolichoctis subrotunda Darlington, 1968
 Dolichoctis sulcicollis Baehr, 1999
 Dolichoctis suturalis Darlington, 1968
 Dolichoctis taiwanensis Baehr, 2013
 Dolichoctis tenuilimbata Oberthur, 1883
 Dolichoctis tetracolon Chaudoir, 1869
 Dolichoctis tetrastigma Chaudoir, 1869
 Dolichoctis tjambaensis Louwerens, 1958
 Dolichoctis torquata Andrewes, 1930
 Dolichoctis ullrichi Baehr, 1999
 Dolichoctis unicolor Emden, 1937
 Dolichoctis unidentata Baehr, 2013
 Dolichoctis vietnamensis Baehr, 2013
 Dolichoctis vitticollis Bates, 1886
 Dolichoctis vixstriata Baehr, 1999
 Dolichoctis weigeli Baehr, 2006

References

Lebiinae